Tertiary and Vocational Education Commission (TVEC) is the Sri Lankan state body responsible for the policy planning, regulation and development of tertiary and vocational education.TVEC was established in 1991 under the Tertiary and Vocational Education Act No 20 of 1990.

References

Statutory boards of Sri Lanka
Vocational education in Sri Lanka